Simon John Birmingham (born 14 June 1974) is an Australian politician who has been a Senator for South Australia since 2007. A member of the Liberal Party, he served in the Morrison Government as Minister for Finance from 2020 to 2022 and as Minister for Trade, Tourism and Investment from 2018 to 2020. He previously served as Minister for Education and Training in the Turnbull government from 2015 to 2018, and as a parliamentary secretary and assistant minister in the Abbott government.

On 30 October 2020, Birmingham was sworn in as Minister for Finance and became Leader of the Government in the Senate following the resignation of Mathias Cormann.

Early life and career
Birmingham grew up on his family's horse agistment property near Gawler, South Australia. He was educated at Gawler High School and the University of Adelaide; neither of his parents had attended university. He has cited his grandmother Madge Herde, a school principal, as a key influence in his decision to enter politics.

Birmingham was named South Australia's Lions Club Youth of the Year in 1992 and awarded the Town of Gawler's Australia Day Young Citizen of the Year Award in 1993. He commenced studying an economics degree, but left his course to work for Senator Robert Hill. He later returned to study and completed a Master of Business Administration from the Adelaide Graduate School of Business, University of Adelaide.

He began his career working as an electorate officer for Senator Robert Hill. In 1997 Birmingham moved from federal to state politics, working as a ministerial advisor to Joan Hall.

Early in 2000 Birmingham moved to Canberra to become the national manager of public affairs for the Australian Hotels Association. In late 2001, Birmingham was appointed chief of staff to the South Australian state minister for tourism and innovation, Martin Hamilton-Smith. Following a change of government in 2002, Birmingham began work with the Winemakers' Federation of Australia where he remained until his appointment to the Senate in 2007.

Political career
At the age of 29, Birmingham won Liberal Party preselection for the marginal seat of Hindmarsh at the 2004 federal election following the retirement of sitting member Chris Gallus. The seat was narrowly won by Labor's Steve Georganas.

After an unsuccessful attempt to fill the vacancy created by Robert Hill's retirement from the Senate in 2006, Birmingham won Liberal Party preselection as a Senate candidate in 2007 federal election and was elected for a six-year term. However, he entered the Senate earlier, being appointed to fill the vacancy caused by the death of Senator Jeannie Ferris. At the time of his appointment on 3 May 2007, Birmingham was the youngest member of the Australian Senate. He is identified with the moderate wing of the Liberal Party.

Birmingham served on Senate Environment, Communications, and Arts Committees from May 2007 to February 2010, the Senate Select Committee on the National Broadband Network as well as the Joint Standing Committee on Treaties from 2007 to September 2012. He was also the Chair of the Senate Environment and Communications References Committee (from September 2012), the Deputy Chair of the Senate Environment and Communications Legislation Committee (from September 2012), a member of the Joint Standing Committee on Electoral Matters (from February 2008) and a member of the Joint Committee on the National Broadband Network (from March 2011).

Birmingham is also deputy chair of the Parliamentary Association for UNICEF. Birmingham has a keen interest in water issues including the health and future of the Murray Darling Basin, and in December 2008 introduced a Private Member's Bill, The Water Amendment (Saving the Goulburn and Murray Rivers) Bill 2008. In December 2009 Birmingham was appointed to the Coalition frontbench as Shadow Parliamentary Secretary for the Murray Darling Basin and Shadow Parliamentary Secretary for Climate Action. After the 2010 election he was re-appointed Shadow Parliamentary Secretary for the Murray Darling Basin and appointed Shadow Parliamentary Secretary for the Environment. He also represented the Shadow Minister for Communications and Broadband, Hon Malcolm Turnbull, in the Senate.

Ministerial appointments 

Following the 2013 federal election, Birmingham served in the Abbott Ministry as a parliamentary secretary to the Minister for the Environment and from September 2013 until December 2014; when he was appointed as the Assistant Minister for Education and Training. He became the Minister for Education and Training in the First Turnbull Ministry following the Liberal Party of Australia leadership spill, September 2015. Upon the installment of the Morrison Ministry in August 2018, he became the Minister for Trade, Tourism and Investment.

On 30 October 2020, Birmingham was further appointed as Leader of the Government in the Senate and Minister for Finance.

Political views
Birmingham is a member of the moderate or liberal wing of the Liberal Party, and was regarded as a key backer of Malcolm Turnbull in the 2015 leadership contest. According to Andrew Tillett, writing in The Australian Financial Review in August 2019, the retirement of Christopher Pyne saw Birmingham "assume the mantle as the most senior moderate" in the party. According to The Sydney Morning Herald, Birmingham is the leader of the Moderate/Modern Liberal faction of the Liberal Party.

Personal life
Birmingham is married to his former campaign manager Courtney Morcombe, who is the chief of staff to former South Australian premier Steven Marshall. The couple have two daughters.

In a 2013 survey of Australian federal politics, Birmingham was one of only four MPs and senators to publicly identify as atheist.

References

External links
Senator Birmingham's Official Website
Summary of parliamentary voting for Senator Simon Birmingham on TheyVoteForYou.org.au

 

1974 births
Abbott Government
Government ministers of Australia
Living people
Liberal Party of Australia members of the Parliament of Australia
Members of the Australian Senate
Members of the Australian Senate for South Australia
Members of the Cabinet of Australia
Politicians from Adelaide
Turnbull Government
University of Adelaide alumni
21st-century Australian politicians
Morrison Government